Synchlora ephippiaria is a moth of the  family Geometridae. It is found on Jamaica and in Peru.

References

Further reading
 

Moths described in 1886
Synchlorini